Giselle Juárez may refer to:
 Giselle Juárez (field hockey)
 Giselle Juarez (softball)